Samuel Ongley may refer to:

 Samuel Ongley (died 1726), MP for Maidstone
Samuel Ongley (died 1747), MP for Bedford and New Shoreham